The 2003–04 season was the 58th season in FK Partizan's existence. This article shows player statistics and all matches (official and friendly) that the club played during the 2003–04 season.

Players

Squad information

Transfers

In

Out

Loan out

Friendlies

Competitions

Overview

First League of Serbia and Montenegro

League table

Serbia and Montenegro Cup

UEFA Champions League

Second qualifying round

Third qualifying round

Group F

See also
 List of FK Partizan seasons

Notes

References

External links
 Official website
 Partizanopedia 2003-04

FK Partizan seasons
Partizan